Bengt Andersson (born 6 March 1966 in Mora, Sweden) is a Swedish rifle shooter. He was a 300 m rifle specialist during most of the 1980-90s and won an individual gold medal in 300 metre rifle prone and was a part of the winning team at the 1998 ISSF World Shooting Championships in Zaragoza, Spain.

External links
 Andersson's profile at ISSF NEWS

1966 births
Living people
Swedish male sport shooters